Cheadle Heath railway station was a railway station in Cheadle Heath, Cheshire, England.

Construction and opening

The station was built on the Midland Railway's New Mills and Heaton Mersey Line (the so-called "Disley cut off" line) to avoid the congestion and junctions of New Mills, Marple, Romiley and Stockport Tiviot Dale and difficult profile of the existing line, slowing down London St Pancras to Manchester Central express trains via the Manchester South District Line. On 1 October 1901, the initial section from Heaton Mersey to Cheadle Heath opened, with a service of passenger trains to Manchester Central. The line through Disley tunnel to New Mills South Junction was opened on 1 July 1902, enabling through services to Derby and other stations.

Initially named Cheadle Heath, from 1 May 1902 to 1 October 1908 the name was Cheadle Heath for Stockport, from 1 October 1908 until 14 June 1965 Cheadle Heath Stockport, and from that date until closure the station reverted to its original name.

Train services

Local trains served Manchester Central and intermediate stations. The Midland Pullman operated a regular morning express service between Manchester Central and London St Pancras, with Cheadle Heath as its only stop before running non-stop to London.

The station remained open to passengers until 2 January 1967 and to freight traffic until 1 July 1968.

Current use of the station site and railway line

By 2009 most of the station's site has now been occupied by a Morrison's supermarket and car park, however a single track remains and is still used by freight trains, mostly carrying limestone from quarries near Buxton in the Peak District to chemical factories near Northwich in Cheshire.

The two railway bridges across the River Mersey at Cheadle Heath North junction have been demolished. Three of the four bridge heads remain. One of them is readily accessible to walkers.

References

Notes

Bibliography

External links
Cheadle Heath Station on navigable 1948 O.S. map
 Information from  Subterranea Britannica 
 Railways of Marple and District From 1794
 Backtrack Volume 17

Disused railway stations in the Metropolitan Borough of Stockport
Former Midland Railway stations
Railway stations in Great Britain opened in 1901
Railway stations in Great Britain closed in 1967
Manchester South District Line
Beeching closures in England